= Los Angeles MLS team =

Los Angeles MLS team may refer to:

- LA Galaxy, a founding member of Major League Soccer, established 1996
- Los Angeles FC, an MLS expansion team, beginning play in 2018
- Chivas USA, a defunct MLS team based in Los Angeles from 2004 to 2014
